The Jharkhand cricket team is a first-class cricket team based in the Indian state of Jharkhand. When the old state of Bihar was split into Jharkhand state and Bihar state, the Jharkhand team took the place of the Bihar cricket team,  as much of the former's state's cricketing infrastructure was in Jharkhand.

History 
Jharkhand State Cricket Association was formed on November 15, 2000 and the team made its first-class debut in November 2004 against Saurashtra in the 2004/05 Ranji Trophy at Madhavrao Scindia Cricket Ground, Rajkot. The match was drawn.

The team won the 2010/11 Vijay Harare Trophy against Gujarat at the Holkar Cricket Stadium in Indore. Jharkhand batted first and were boosted by several useful contributions from their batsmen while Gujarat in their reply failed to measure up against a dominating bowling performance to sink to a 159-run defeat.

In 2021, Jharkhand have scored 422 runs losing 9 wickets in the first innings. It is the highest ever total in 50 over domestic cricket in India. In March 2022, in the preliminary quarter-final match against Nagaland in the 2021–22 Ranji Trophy, Jharkhand made their highest team total in a first-class cricket match with 880, the fourth-highest team total in the Ranji Trophy.

Home grounds

Notable players

Players from Jharkhand who have played Test cricket for India, along with year of Test debut:
Mahendra Singh Dhoni (2005)
Varun Aaron (2011)
Shahbaz Nadeem (2019)

Players from Jharkhand who have played ODI but not Test cricket for India, along with year of ODI debut :
Saurabh Tiwary (2010)
Ishan Kishan (2021)

Notable players at the domestic level:
Ishank Jaggi

Current squad 

Players with international caps are listed in bold.

Updated as on 31 January 2023

Coaching staff
Coaching staff have one head coach.
 Head Coach :- Rajiv Kumar

See also
 Jharkhand State Cricket Association
 Bihar Cricket Association
 Bihar cricket team

References

External links 
 Official website of Jharkhand State Cricket Association
 Jharkhand at CricketArchive

Indian first-class cricket teams
Cricket in Jharkhand
2004 establishments in Jharkhand
Cricket clubs established in 2004